John Bramis or Bromis (14th century) was an English Augustinian friar and writer.

Bramis was attached to Thetford Priory. He translated the Romance of Waldef from French metre into Latin prose. This romance was originally written in English verse, and had been done into French at the desire of a lady.

A historical compilation entitled Historia compendiosa de regibus Britonum, and attributed to Ralph de Diceto, was printed in Thomas Gale, Quindecim Scriptores. The author repeatedly refers to a former compilation of Bromus; the work derives in fact from Geoffrey of Monmouth. The Oxford Dictionary of National Biography rejects the identification of Bromus with Bramis, that had been made by John Bale and Thomas Tanner.

References

Year of birth missing
Year of death missing
14th-century English people
14th-century English writers
English Christian monks
English translators
People from Thetford
Augustinian friars
English male non-fiction writers
14th-century Latin writers
14th-century translators